On March 8, 1994 more than 300 people reported a sighting of multiple UFOs in West Michigan, United States. The UFOs were described as resembling flickering Christmas lights, consisting of five or six objects, cylindrically shaped or circles with blue, red, white and green lights. According to Chicago Tribune, there were over 300 witnesses in 42 counties of Michigan (including  Muskegon, Ottawa, Berrien and Allegan counties). The sightings were reported to 9-1-1 and were observed by police and a National Weather Service radar at Muskegon County Airport.

The Mutual UFO Network interviewed dozens of witnesses, but the event remains unexplained. The group claims to have ruled out most earthly explanations, such as a small plane, gas, blimp, weather balloon, satellite, shooting star, military aircraft or debris.

Legacy 
The event was detailed on an episode of the Netflix series Unsolved Mysteries in 2022.

References

See also
UFO sightings in the United States

1994 in Michigan
UFO sightings in the United States